This is a list of Swedish companies owned by the Swedish State:

State-owned companies are legally in a form of aktiebolag but mainly or fully state-owned. They are expected to be funded by their sales, and not be given direct tax money. A big customer might be the state or a government agency.

Many companies originate from a former government agency. Government agencies are something different, usually funded by tax money but do also sell services, and are not an authority. The government has tried to avoid having agencies doing commercial activities, by separating out areas that compete with private companies into government-owned companies, for example within road construction. The reason is both to avoid unfair competition (because it could mean using tax money to beat private companies), and a wish to have a market economy instead of a planned economy as much as possible. Based on the tradition of avoiding "ministerial rule", the government has avoided interfering with the business of the companies, and allowed them to go international. This has been somewhat controversial. For example, Akademiska Hus which owns buildings used by universities is claiming commercial rent levels, much higher than traditionally, causing trouble for higher education.

Wholly owned
Akademiska Hus
Apoteket
Green Cargo
Göta Kanalbolag; see Göta Canal
Infranord
Jernhusen
Lernia
LKAB
RISE - Research Institutes of Sweden
Samhall
SBAB
SJ
Sveaskog
Svenska Spel
Casino Cosmopol
Swedavia
Svevia
Swedish Space Corporation
Systembolaget
Teracom
Vattenfall

Shared ownership

PostNord (60%)
SAS Group (21,4%)
Telia Company (37,3%)

Commercial government agencies
Government agencies might do activities competing with privately owned companies. They usually are funded by tax money but can also sell services. The here listed agencies are commercial, mainly funded by sales or fees.

Svenska Kraftnät
Swedish Civil Aviation Administration
Swedish Maritime Administration

See also
Government of Sweden
Government agencies in Sweden
 List of government-owned companies
List of Swedish companies
Economy of Sweden

References

External links
State-owned companies
In Swedish
Central government budget
Central government annual report in Swedish

 
 
Government enterprises
Sweden e
Sweden